Rastislalić (Растислалић) was a Serbian noble family that held lands in the Braničevo region of Serbia in the 14th century, initially under the Serbian crown and later under the Hungarian. They held Braničevo and Kučevo.

History
During the rule of Stefan Uroš IV Dušan 'the Mighty' (r. 1331-1355), Branko (d. 1352) gained control of the Braničevo region, he was accidentally killed during a hunt by voivode Vuk Kosača, his relatives later avenged his death in 1359, when they murdered Vuk. The feud continued between the two families, Stefan Uroš V 'the Weak' was at war with Tsar Symeon, the Rastislalići turned to the other side of the Danube, where Hungarian-ruled territory in Mačva was held by Ban Nicholas I Garay. A Hungarian band was sent to take care of the enemies in Braničevo, and they became vassals of the Kingdom of Hungary. In 1359, perhaps at their invitation, Louis I of Hungary marched into Serbia and defeated Uroš V.

Radič Branković was the last feudal lord; he was evicted in 1379 by Knez Lazar who issued a military action against him.

The family also issued a regional currency, the "Helmet dinars" one of only three to be created prior to the end of the Serbian Empire in 1371.

Members
 Branko Rastislalić, domesticus of Podunavlje (d. 1352), Serbian crown
 Radič Branković, Lord of Braničevo -1379, under Hungarian crown
 Brajko, nobleman
 Raosav, nobleman

References

Further reading
 Zeljko Fajfrić: Sveta loza Stefana Nemanje
 Oblasni gospodari u 14. veku (Serbian)

 
Serbian Empire
14th century in Serbia
Serbian noble families